MWV may refer to:

 Madagascar World Voice, shortwave radio station in Mahajanga
 Man-wide vehicle, vehicle not much wider than a person
 Martin Werhand Verlag, German publishing house
 MeadWestvaco, American packaging company in Richmond, Virginia
 Mendelssohn-Werkverzeichnis, catalogue of the works of Felix Mendelssohn
 Mount Washington Valley, New Hampshire, United States